Kate Halford was the author of the '365' series of cookbooks published in London in the 1910s. Halford was listed in the Epicure's Directory of 1899 as 'Teacher of cookery and dresscutting'. She also co-authored a successful book on Jewish cookery with her sister Mrs May Henry.

Books 
 1907 (co-authored with Mrs May Henry) Dainty Dinners and Dishes for Jewish Families London: Wertheimer, Lea and Co.
 1909 (co-authored with Alice Model): 365 Vegetarian Dishes: Neither Flesh, Fowl nor Fishes London: Dean and Son
 1912: 365 Salads and Savouries London: Dean and Son
 1915: 365 Puddings and Pies London: Dean and Son

References

Women cookbook writers
British food writers
19th-century births
20th-century deaths
Year of birth missing
Year of death missing